The 2023 Indianapolis 500 (branded as the 107th Running of the Indianapolis 500 presented by Gainbridge for sponsorship reasons) is a 500-mile (804.7 km, 200 lap) race in the 2023 IndyCar Series, scheduled for Sunday, May 28, 2023, at the Indianapolis Motor Speedway in Speedway, Indiana. The month of May activities formally begin on May 12 with the GMR Grand Prix on the combined road course. Practice on the oval is slated to begin on May 15, and time trials will take place on May 20–21. Carb Day, the traditional final day of practice, along with the Pit Stop Challenge, will take place on May 26.

Marcus Ericsson of Chip Ganassi Racing enters the race as the defending winner. 2013 Indianapolis 500 winner and 2004 series champion Tony Kanaan announced that he will retire after the race.

Race background

Sponsorship
On May 25, 2022, it was announced that online financial services company Gainbridge reached a multiyear agreement to extend their presenting sponsorship of the Indianapolis 500. The extension was for an undisclosed length. This will be the first year under the current deal. Gainbridge originally signed a four-year deal which was in place from 2019 to 2022.

Rule changes
Championship points for the Indianapolis 500 will revert back to standard point values. From 2014 to 2022, double points were awarded at the Indianapolis 500. Bonus points awarded during qualifying remain unchanged from 2022.
New rear attenuators, rear wheel tethers, and new front suspension pieces have been introduced and made mandatory.

2023 IndyCar Series

The 2023 Indianapolis 500 will be the sixth race of the 2023 NTT IndyCar Series season. Marcus Ericsson won the season opener at St. Petersburg. The season will continue at Texas, Long Beach, Alabama, then the GMR Grand Prix will lead into the Indy 500.

Race schedules
The 2023 IndyCar Series schedule was announced on September 27, 2022 with the Indianapolis 500 scheduled for Sunday, May 28. Practice, time trials, and other ancillary events are scheduled for the two weeks leading up to the race. The Open Test will be on April 20–21, which will include Rookie Orientation and Refresher tests.

The GMR Grand Prix, including the Road to Indy races, will again serve as the opening weekend of track activity, on May 12. The Freedom 100 was left off the schedule for the fourth year in a row. The 2023 Indy NXT series (formerly known as Indy Lights) will include a race on the road course during GMR Grand Prix weekend.

Source: 2023 Indianapolis 500 Event Schedule

Broadcasting

Television
The race will be televised on NBC and Peacock Premium in the United States.

On February 17, NBC announced that Mike Tirico and Danica Patrick would once again return for pre-race and post-race coverage, as they had done together since 2020. Leigh Diffey, Townsend Bell, and James Hinchcliffe will be the booth announcers for the race.

Radio
The race will be carried by the IndyCar Radio Network.

References

External links
Indianapolis Motor Speedway – Official site
NTT IndyCar Series – Official site

Indianapolis 500 races
Indianapolis 500
Indianapolis 500
Indianapolis 500
Indianapolis 500
21st century in Indianapolis